Mokhtar Benmoussa (born August 11, 1986) is an Algerian footballer. He plays primarily as a left-winger but has also been used as a left-midfielder and a left-back. Benmoussa is an Algeria youth international and has represented Algeria at the Under-17 and Under-23 level. He also has 1 cap for the Algeria A' national football team.

Club career
Born in Tlemcen, Benmoussa began his career with his hometown club of WA Tlemcen.

On June 10, 2010, Benmoussa signed a one-year contract with ES Sétif.

International career
On April 8, 2012, Benmoussa was called up by Algeria coach Vahid Halilhodžić for a four-day training camp for domestic players.

On May 12, 2012, Benmoussa was called up for the first time to the Algeria national team for the 2014 FIFA World Cup qualifiers against Mali and Rwanda, and the return leg of the 2013 Africa Cup of Nations qualifier against Gambia.

Honours

Club
 ES Sétif
 Algerian Ligue Professionnelle 1 (1): 2011-12
 Algerian Cup (1): 2012

 USM Alger
 Algerian Ligue Professionnelle 1 (3): 2013-14, 2015-16, 2018–19
 Algerian Cup (1): 2013
 Algerian Super Cup (2): 2013, 2016
 UAFA Club Cup (1): 2013

References

External links

 
 
 

1986 births
Algerian footballers
Living people
Paradou AC players
WA Tlemcen players
ES Sétif players
Algerian Ligue Professionnelle 1 players
Algeria A' international footballers
Algeria under-23 international footballers
Algeria youth international footballers
People from Tlemcen
Algeria international footballers
USM Alger players
Association football fullbacks
Association football wingers
21st-century Algerian people